Jody Patrick (born 14 June 1978) is a female badminton player from Canada.

Patrick competed in badminton at the 2004 Summer Olympics in mixed doubles with partner Mike Beres.  They lost to Fredrik Bergström and Johanna Persson of Sweden in the round of 32.

References

1978 births
Living people
Sportspeople from Alberta
Canadian female badminton players
Badminton players at the 2004 Summer Olympics
Olympic badminton players of Canada
Badminton players at the 2003 Pan American Games
Pan American Games silver medalists for Canada
Pan American Games medalists in badminton
Commonwealth Games competitors for Canada
Badminton players at the 1998 Commonwealth Games
Medalists at the 2003 Pan American Games
20th-century Canadian women
21st-century Canadian women